The Eminem Show is the fourth studio album by American rapper Eminem. After it had originally scheduled for release on June 4, 2002, the album was released nine days earlier on May 26, 2002, through Aftermath Entertainment, Shady Records, and Interscope Records due to pirating and bootlegging of it. The album saw Eminem take a substantially more predominant production role; most of it was self-produced, with his longtime collaborator Jeff Bass. It features guest appearances from Obie Trice, D12, Dr. Dre, Nate Dogg, Dina Rae and Eminem's daughter Hailie Jade Scott-Mathers.

The album incorporates a heavier use of rap rock than Eminem's previous albums, and its themes are predominantly based on Eminem's prominence in hip hop culture, as well as his ambivalent thoughts of fame. The album also features political commentary on the United States, including references to 9/11, Osama bin Laden, the War on terror, President George W. Bush, Lynne Cheney and Tipper Gore. Due to its less satirical and shock factor lyrical approach, The Eminem Show was regarded as Eminem's most personal album at the time and a step back from the Slim Shady alter ego.

Widely considered the most anticipated album of 2002, The Eminem Show debuted at number one on the Billboard 200 and stood there for six non-consecutive weeks. It sold over 1.3 million copies in its second week in the US, where it registered a full week of sales. It also topped the UK Albums Chart for five consecutive weeks. It produced four commercially successful singles, "Without Me", "Cleanin' Out My Closet", "Superman", and "Sing for the Moment", and it features one of his most popular songs, "'Till I Collapse". The album was met with positive critical reviews, with praise directed at Eminem's mature, introspective lyricism and the album's experimental production.

The Eminem Show was both the best-selling album of 2002 in the United States and the best-selling album worldwide of 2002. The album was certified Diamond by the Recording Industry Association of America (RIAA), and its worldwide sales of 27 million copies make it one of the best-selling albums of all time and the second best-selling album of the 21st century. At the 2003 Grammy Awards, it was nominated for Album of the Year and won Best Rap Album, while "Without Me" won Best Music Video. Blender, Muzik and LAUNCH named it the best album of 2002, and several publications named it among the best albums of the 2000s decade.

Background 
Speaking to Spin, Eminem said, "Eventually, I might need some drama in my life to inspire me [...] With The Marshall Mathers LP, everything that everybody was saying–I took that, and it was my ammo. And then when shit died down a little bit, I had other turmoil in my personal life, so that was what I was able to dump out on The Eminem Show. Now, I just gotta wait for the next phase of my life. But something always seems to happen, man; something's always gotta be fucking turbulent."

Eminem cited that the inspiration for the album was taken from the Peter Weir-directed 1998 science fiction comedy-drama film The Truman Show. Jim Carrey starred in the film as the lead character Truman Burbank, a man who unwittingly lives inside a TV show, where his life is broadcast to viewers around the world. Eminem spoke on the film's influence, saying, "My life felt like it was becoming a circus around that time, and I felt like I was always being watched [...] Basically, Jim Carrey wrote my album."

Recording
Speaking with Rolling Stone in 2002, Eminem said ""Sing for the Moment" was the first song I wrote for the album; "Cleanin Out My Closet" was the second. I had the line in "Cleanin Out My Closet" — "I'd like to welcome y'all out to The Eminem Show"—and it was just a line, but I sat back and I was like, "My life is really like a fucking show." I have songs on the album that I wrote when I was in that shit last year, with a possible jail sentence hangin' over my head and all the emotions going through the divorce. I went through a lot of shit last year [lawsuits, divorce and the threat of jail time] that I resolved at the same time, all in the same year. And, yeah, that's when half of the album was wrote.

Eminem had started recording the album around the same time he was filming 8 Mile. Production was used for both the soundtrack of the film and his album. The album also saw Eminem take a substantially more predominant production role; most of it was self-produced, with his longtime collaborator Jeff Bass co-producing several tracks (mainly the songs which eventually became the released singles). Dr. Dre, in addition to being the album's executive producer, produced only three individual tracks: "Business", "Say What You Say", and "My Dad's Gone Crazy". Regarding his increase in producing, Eminem told Rolling Stone, "I actually know how to program a drum machine now. It used to be so simple—just writing lyrics and raps, laying vocals and leaving the studio was great. But now that I'm so into producing, it's a fucking job."

Music and lyrics 
Stylistically, The Eminem Show has a lighter tone than The Marshall Mathers LP and incorporates a heavier use of rap rock than Eminem's previous albums, featuring mixed guitar-driven melodies with hip-hop rhythms. In an interview with British magazine The Face in April 2002, Eminem said that he treated the album like it was a rock record. He continued that he "tried to get the best of both worlds" on the album. Eminem spoke on specific rock influences, saying, "I listened to a lot of '70s rock growing up, when I was real little. When I go back and listen to them songs, like Led Zeppelin or Aerosmith, Jimi Hendrix...'70s rock had this incredible feel to it." Notably, "Sing For The Moment" contains a sample of Aerosmith's "Dream On" as well as a reinterpretation of its guitar solo. Another rock sample on the album is the kick-clap beat of "'Till I Collapse", which is an interpolation of the intro from Queen's "We Will Rock You".

The themes of The Eminem Show are predominantly based on Eminem's prominence in hip hop culture and the subsequent envy towards him, as well as his thoughts on his unexpected enormous success and its consequential negative effects on his life. The album also touches on Eminem's thoughts on themes surrounding American politics, including references to 9/11, Osama bin Laden, the war on terror President George W. Bush, Lynne Cheney and Tipper Gore. Speaking on his use of political commentary on the album, Eminem told Rolling Stone, "You put your shit out there for the world to see and to judge, and whoever agrees with you agrees with you. Even my most die-hard fans don't agree with everything I say. These are my views, this is how I see it. You may have your own opinion, but you may not get to project it to the world like I do." Writing for Spin, rock critic Alan Light said that the album may have proved that Eminem is the most "dexterous, vivid writer in pop music". The album also sees Eminem dissing several artists, including Mariah Carey, Moby, Canibus and Limp Bizkit, while Dr. Dre disses Jermaine Dupri on the song "Say What You Say".

Lyrically, the album displays a dramatic shift from the misogynistic and homophobic lyrics presented on The Marshall Mathers LP. Eminem told Spin, "One of the frustrating things was people saying, 'He's got to cuss to sell records,' [...] That's why with this album, I toned it down a bit as far as shock value. I wanted to show that I'm a solid artist, and I'm here to stay." Due to its less satirical and shock factor lyrical approach, The Eminem Show was regarded as a departure from Eminem's previous albums with it being more personal and reflective and a step back of the Slim Shady alter ego. Eminem said during an interview with MTV that he felt that The Eminem Show was his "best record so far". In 2006, Q said that Eminem's first two albums "aired dirty laundry, then the world's most celebrated rapper [Eminem] examined life in the hall of mirrors he'd built for himself."

With the release of The Eminem Show, Eminem was considered to be more socially acceptable: there were no protests over his lyrics, boycotts, and talk shows discussing his impact on America's youth. A columnist of The New York Observer wrote that Eminem had become a "guilty pleasure" for baby boomers, describing him as "the most compelling figure to have emerged from popular music since the holy trinity of [Bob] Dylan, [John] Lennon, and [Mick] Jagger."

Censored version
The "clean version" of The Eminem Show censors many more profanities and derogatory words than in clean versions of Eminem's previous albums, in which the words "goddamn", "prick", "bastard", "piss", "bitch", "ass", and "shit" were allowed. This album allowed no profanities, and the profanities were either muted, obscured by sound effects, or back-masked. In addition to this, entire sentences were sometimes removed from the censored version for being very sexually charged. The entire song "Drips" was removed in early clean versions and is heard only as four seconds of silence moving on to the next track, "Without Me". Later on, digital releases of the clean version removed "Drips" completely, moving the next 11 songs up on the tracklist. Some copies of the clean version, however, feature an edited version of "Drips".

There are some inconsistencies in clean version's censorship. In the skit "The Kiss", Eminem's shouting of the word "motherfucker!" is still audible in the censored version. In the track, "Soldier", which is a continuation of "The Kiss", the word "bitch" was used three times, and can be clearly heard once. "Hailie's Song" contains the back masked phrase "want her" which can be easily mistaken as "abort her" on both the explicit and clean versions. Also, in "White America", the word "flag" is back masked when he raps, "To burn the flag and replace it with a parental advisory sticker".

Critical reception

The Eminem Show was met with critical acclaim. At Metacritic, which assigns a normalized rating out of 100 to reviews from mainstream publications, the album received an average score of 75, based on 20 reviews.

Alex Needham of NME hailed The Eminem Show as a "fantastic third album" that "is bigger, bolder and far more consistent than its predecessors". David Browne of Entertainment Weekly felt the album's more personal lyrics "succeed in fleshing out Eminem's complexities and contradictions", nonetheless concluding that "[l]ike its predecessors, though, The Eminem Show is a testament to the skills of its star. The sludgy rapping of such guests as D12 only confirms Eminem's dizzying prowess, gob-spewing individuality, and wickedly prankish humor." Writing for Rolling Stone, Kris Ex argued that Eminem "may have made the best rap rock album in history."

Slant Magazines Sal Cinquemani wrote that he "peels back some of the bullshit façade and reveals a little bit of the real Marshall Mathers" on an album that "displays a—dare I say it?—more 'mature' Eminem." In his review for AllMusic, Stephen Thomas Erlewine said the album "proves Eminem is the gold standard in pop music in 2002, delivering stylish, catchy, dense, funny, political music that rarely panders". Critic Robert Christgau wrote: "I think it represents an articulate, coherent, formally appropriate response to Eminem's changing position and role, one that acknowledges the privileges and alienations that accrue to all fame as well as the resolution of Marshall Mathers's worst traumas and the specifics of his success."

Edna Gundersen of USA Today wrote that Eminem is "as good as he gets but in the end inflicts more damage on himself, hoisting The Eminem Show to a level of self-absorption rivaled only by Woody Allen", and despite the presence of some mediocre tracks, he "displays an admirable dexterity in blending invective and invention, even though his approach is more reactionary than revolutionary." Uncut wrote, "Behind the hype and the swagger, he's still baring enough of his soul for The Eminem Show to be compelling theatre." Q was more mixed in its assessment, stating that as "Eminem outgrows his old alter-id, so the obligatory pantomime villainy, skits and crass cameos by Shady Records signings become a hindrance." Marc L. Hill of PopMatters felt that the album lacked the shock factor of his previous albums and described it as "a disappointing combination of promising musical experimentation and uninspired lyrics."

Blender, Muzik and LAUNCH named The Eminem Show the best album of 2002. The album became Eminem's third to win the Grammy Award for Best Rap Album, while "Without Me" won Eminem his first Best Music Video award. The album swept the MTV Music Video Awards, winning four awards for Best Male Video, Video of the Year, Best Direction, and Best Rap Video. The album also won Best Album at the 2002 MTV Europe Music Awards, both Album of the Year and Top R&B/Hip Hop Album at the 2002 Billboard Music Awards, both Favorite Rap/Hip-Hop Album and Favorite Pop/Rock Album at the 2003 American Music Awards, Best International Album at the 2003 Brit Awards, and International Album of the Year at the Juno Awards of 2003.

Reappraisal
The Eminem Show received critical praise by most music critics and is often debated as Eminem's most personal and best work. The album cemented Eminem's "three-peat" of classic hip hop albums, following the critical appraisal of The Slim Shady LP and The Marshall Mathers LP. In 2003, the album was ranked number 317 on Rolling Stone's list of The 500 Greatest Albums of All Time, and was later ranked at number 84 on the same magazine's Best Albums of the 2000s Decade. In 2007, it was ranked number 63 by The National Association of Recording Merchandisers, in conjunction with the Rock and Roll Hall of Fame, in their list of the Definite 200 Albums of All Time. In 2012, Complex magazine deemed it a "classic" album that "cemented Eminem's place as one of the most important figures in rap history", and has included it on their list of 100 Best Albums of the Complex Decade, placing it at number 5, Following the 15th anniversary of the album, the Grammy Awards also described The Eminem Show as a "classic album". Popdose ranked the album at 79 on its Best Albums of the Decade list. In 2015, The Eminem Show was ranked number 56 on the Greatest of All Time Billboard 200 Albums.

Commercial performance
The Eminem Show was originally scheduled for release on June 4, 2002; however, pirated and bootlegged copies appeared online via peer-to-peer networks and began surfacing on the streets. It was provided by Rabid Neurosis (RNS), an MP3 warez release organisation who pirated the album twenty-five days prior to release. Radio show Opie and Anthony broadcast the entire album on May 17, 2002. Interscope decided to release the album earlier than planned, on May 28 to prevent bootlegging. However, many stores in the United States began selling it even earlier than the new release date on Sunday, May 26, and some put the album out as early as Friday. Promotional posters in stores read, "America Couldn't Wait". Due to the premature release by many retailers on a Sunday, the album had only one day of official sales for the chart week and was unavailable in Walmart stores during that period. The Eminem Show was Eminem's first album to include lyrics to all its songs inside the CD booklet. Additionally, the first 2,000,000 copies of the album shipped in the United States included a bonus DVD with an exclusive interview and live footage. A week before the album's release, it was the second-most played CD on computers, the highest ranking ever for an unreleased title. It was considered the most anticipated album of 2002.

Despite the confusion over the exact release date, the album still managed to have a very successful debut on the charts. The Eminem Show debuted at number one on the Billboard 200, selling approximately 284,000 copies in its first day, marking the first time an album had topped the chart from only a day's sale. It sold 1,322,000 copies in the following week, its first full week of sales, then sold 809,000 copies in its third week and 529,562 copies in its fourth week to bring its four-week sales total to just under 3 million copies. The album sold 381,000 copies in its fifth week and topped the Billboard 200 for a fifth and final consecutive week. On March 7, 2011, the album was certified Diamond by the Recording Industry Association of America (RIAA) for shipping 10 million copies, making it Eminem's second album to receive a Diamond certification in the United States. It has also achieved Diamond certification in Canada and Double Diamond in Australia.

The Eminem Show has sold 27 million copies worldwide, making it one of the best-selling albums of all time and Eminem's best-selling album. It reached number one in 18 other countries: Argentina, Australia, Austria, Belgium, Canada, Czech Republic, the Netherlands, Finland, Germany, Greece, Ireland, Italy, New Zealand, Norway, South Africa, Sweden, Switzerland and the UK. The album also spent five consecutive weeks at the top of the UK Albums Chart.

 Expanded edition 
On May 24, 2022, Eminem announced the release of the expanded edition of the album on his social media to celebrate its 20th anniversary. On May 26, 2022, Eminem released the new expanded edition, which contains instrumentals of selected tracks, freestyles and live versions of songs from previous albums performed with his longtime friend and collaborator  Proof at Tramps, New York and Fuji Rock Festival, Japan. It also features four new tracks which were recorded during the initial recording sessions but not included in the original version of the album; "Stimulate", which was kept off the album due to time constraints and instead appeared on the bonus disc of the 8 Mile soundtrack album, "Bump Heads" and "The Conspiracy Freestyle" (which had appeared on other Shady Records releases), and an unreleased song, "Jimmy, Brian, and Mike", which had a verse and chorus re-recorded by Eminem especially for the expanded edition. Physical versions of the expanded edition will be available later this year, including a 4xLP vinyl set, CD, and cassette.

Track listingNotes'''
 signifies a co-producer.
 signifies an additional producer.
Early clean versions of the album replace "Drips" with 4 seconds of silence. Later clean versions feature an edited version of the song.
Another censored version of the album did not allow the words "goddamn", "prick", "bastard", "piss", "bitch", "ass", "shit" and "fuck" to be left uncensored.
"Curtain Close (skit)" is performed by Ken Kaniff, who Eminem portrays at the end of the album before continuing on with the persona on Relapse'' in 2009, as displayed in the album booklet.

Personnel

Jeff Bass – producer , co-producer , additional production , keyboards , guitars , bass 
Steve Baughman – engineer and mixing 
Steve Berman – performer 
Bizarre – featured vocals 
Bob Canero – assistant engineer 
Dr. Dre – featured vocals , producer , mixing 
Mike Elizondo – keyboards , bass , guitars , additional keyboards 
Eminem – vocals, producer 
Ron Feemster – keyboards 
Shy Felder – background vocals 
Francis Forde – assistant engineer 
Marti Frederiksen – Joe Perry's guitar engineer 
Brian "Big Bass" Gardner – mastering
DJ Head – additional production , drum programming , additional drum programming 
Mauricio "Veto" Iragorri – engineer , additional engineering , mixing , mix engineer 
Steve King – engineer , mixing , mix engineer , guitar and bass , additional guitars , television voiceover 
Gary Kozlowski – background vocals 
Urban Kris – assistant engineer 
Kuniva – featured vocals 
Hailie Jade Mathers – featured vocals 
James "Flea" McCrone – assistant engineer 
Swifty McVay – featured vocals 
Mel-Man – drum programming 
Nate Dogg – featured vocals 
Traci Nelson – background vocals 
Conesha Monet Owens – background vocals 
Joe Perry – guitar solo 
Denaun "Kon Artis" Porter – featured vocals, co-producer, and drum programming 
Proof – featured vocals 
Lynette Purdy – background vocals 
Dina Rae – featured vocals , additional background vocals 
Luis Resto – keyboards 
Alex Reverberi – assistant engineer 
Paul D. Rosenberg, Esq. – performer 
Thomas Rounds – assistant engineer 
Mike Strange – assistant engineer 
Timbaland – phone call 
Obie Trice – featured vocals 
Barbara Wilson – background vocals

Charts

Weekly charts

Year-end charts

Decade-end charts

Certifications and sales

See also
 Album era
 Grammy Award for Best Rap Album
 List of best-selling albums in the United States
 List of best-selling albums
 List of fastest-selling albums worldwide

References

Eminem albums
2002 albums
Rap rock albums by American artists
Aftermath Entertainment albums
Albums produced by Dr. Dre
Albums produced by Eminem
Albums produced by Mr. Porter
Brit Award for International Album
Interscope Records albums
Interscope Geffen A&M Records albums
Shady Records albums
Grammy Award for Best Rap Album
Juno Award for International Album of the Year albums